The GRE physics test is an examination administered by the Educational Testing Service (ETS). The test attempts to determine the extent of the examinees' understanding of fundamental principles of physics and their ability to apply them to problem solving. Many graduate schools require applicants to take the exam and base admission decisions in part on the results.

The scope of the test is largely that of the first three years of a standard
United States undergraduate physics curriculum, since many students who plan to continue to graduate school apply during the first half of the fourth year. It consists of 100 five-option multiple-choice questions covering subject areas including classical mechanics, electromagnetism, wave phenomena and optics, thermal physics, relativity, atomic and nuclear physics, quantum mechanics, laboratory techniques, and mathematical methods. The table below indicates the relative weights, as asserted by ETS, and detailed contents of the major topics.

Major content topics

1. Classical mechanics (20%)
 kinematics
 Newton's laws of motion
 work and energy
 rotational motion about a fixed axis
 dynamics of systems of particles
 central forces and celestial mechanics
 three-dimensional particle dynamics
 Lagrangian and Hamiltonian formalism
 noninertial reference frames
 elementary topics in fluid mechanics

2. Electromagnetism (18%)
 electrostatics
 currents and DC circuits
 magnetic fields in free space
 Lorentz force
Induction
Maxwell's equations and their applications
 electromagnetic waves (electromagnetic radiation)
 AC circuits
 magnetic and electric fields in matter

3. Optics and wave phenomena (9%)
 wave properties
 superposition
 interference
 diffraction
 geometrical optics
 light polarization
 Doppler effect

4. Thermodynamics and statistical mechanics (10%)
 laws of thermodynamics
 thermodynamic processes
 equations of state
 ideal gases
 Kinetic theory of gases
 ensembles
 statistical concepts and calculation of thermodynamic quantities
 thermal expansion and heat transfer

5. Quantum mechanics (12%)
 fundamental concepts
 solutions of the Schrödinger wave equation
 square wells (Particle in a box)
 harmonic oscillators
 hydrogenic atoms
 spin
 angular momentum
 wave function symmetry
 elementary perturbation theory

6. Atomic physics (10%)
 properties of electrons
 Bohr model
 energy quantization
 atomic structure
 atomic spectra
 selection rules
 black-body radiation
 x-rays
 atoms in electric and magnetic fields

7. Special relativity (6%)
 introductory concepts of special relativity
 time dilation
 length contraction
 simultaneity
 energy and momentum
 four-vectors and Lorentz transformation

8. Laboratory methods (6%)
 data and error analysis
 electronics
 instrumentation
 radiation detection
 counting statistics
 interaction of charged particles with matter
 laser and optical interferometers
 dimensional analysis
 fundamental applications of probability and statistics

9. Specialized topics (9%)
 particle and nuclear physics
 nuclear properties
 radioactive decay
 fission and fusion
 reactions
 fundamental properties of elementary particles
 condensed matter
 crystal structure
 x-ray diffraction
 thermal properties
 electron theory of metals
 semiconductors
 superconductors
 mathematical methods
 single and multivariate calculus
 coordinate systems (rectangular, cylindrical, spherical)
 vector algebra and vector differential operators
 Fourier series
 partial differential equations
 boundary value problems
 matrices and determinants
 functions of complex variables
 miscellaneous
 astrophysics
 computer applications

See also

 Graduate Record Examination
 GRE Biochemistry Test
 GRE Biology Test
 GRE Chemistry Test
 GRE Literature in English Test
 GRE Mathematics Test
 GRE Psychology Test
 Graduate Management Admission Test (GMAT)
 Graduate Aptitude Test in Engineering (GATE)

References

External links
 Official Description of the GRE Physics Test
 Detailed Solutions to ETS released tests - The Missing Solutions Manual, free online, and User Comments and discussions on individual problems
 More solutions to the released tests - Includes solutions to the recently released 2008 exam
 GRE Prep Course at Ohio State University - Preparation course, with links to all 4 publicly released Physics GRE tests, as well as links to other Physics GRE resources
 GR0877 Solutions - Solutions to 2008 exam
  - Physics GRE Review at Troy University

GRE standardized tests
Physics education
Standardized tests